Docking is the removal of portions of an animal's tail. While docking and bobbing are more commonly used to refer to removal of the tail, the term cropping is used in reference to the ears. Tail docking occurs in one of two ways. The first involves constricting the blood supply to the tail with a rubber ligature for a few days until the tail falls off. The second involves the severance of the tail with surgical scissors or a scalpel. The length to which tails are docked varies by breed, and is often specified in the breed standard.

Docking is illegal, or restricted, in many countries.

Some dog breeds have naturally occurring bobtail lines. These appear similar to docked dogs but are a distinct naturally occurring phenotype.

History

Purpose
Historically, tail docking was thought to prevent rabies, strengthen the back, increase the animal's speed, and prevent injuries when ratting, fighting, and baiting.

Tail docking is done in modern times either for prophylactic, therapeutic, cosmetic purposes, and/or to prevent injury. For dogs that work in the field, such as some hunting dogs, herding dogs, or terrier dogs, tails can collect burrs and foxtails, causing pain and infection and, due to the tail's wagging, may be subject to abrasion or other injury while moving through dense brush or thickets. Bones in the tail can be broken by impact in the field, causing spinal injury to the tail, or terriers can become stuck underground, necessitating being pulled out by the tail, in which case the docked tail protects the dog from rescued. It also protects the tail from by injured - by removing it. The American Veterinary Medical Association (the largest veterinary professional organization in the United States), disputes these justifications, saying "These justifications for docking working dogs' tails lack substantial scientific support. In the largest study to date on tail injuries in dogs the incidence was 0.23% and it was calculated that approximately 500 dogs need to be docked to prevent one tail injury."

Modern practice
Docking of puppies younger than 10 to 14 days old is routinely carried out by both breeders and veterinarians without anesthesia.

While the tails of some working dogs are docked to prevent injury or infection, the tails of larger dogs commonly used for guard work or protection work (not to be confused with patrol work where a handler can provide secondary aid) may be docked to prevent their tails from being grabbed in a fight. This is most common in the Rottweiler, Doberman Pinscher, Bandog, Cane Corso, Boerboel, etc.

Criticism
Robert Wansborough found in a 1996 paper
that docking tails puts dogs at a disadvantage in several ways. First, dogs use their tails to communicate with other dogs (and with people); a dog without a tail might be significantly handicapped in conveying fear, caution, aggression, playfulness, and so on. Leaver and Reimchen, in 2007, found that longer tails were more effective than shorter tails at "conveying different intraspecific cues, such as those provided by tail motion".

It has also been suggested that certain breeds use their tails as rudders when swimming, and possibly for balance when running; so active dogs with docked tails might be at a disadvantage compared to their tailed peers. Videos comparing docked and undocked dogs running and jumping show that dogs who are docked have to work harder to compensate for the loss of the tail. Canine pathologist and sports-medicine expert Prof. Chris Zink believes the extra stress imposed on the joints can have long-term health consequences.

In 2007, Stephen Leaver, a graduate student at the University of Victoria, published a paper on tail docking which found that tail length was important in the transmission of social cues. The study found that dogs with shorter tails (docked tails) would be approached with caution, as if the approaching dog was unsure of the emotional state of the docked dog. The study goes on to suggest that dogs with docked tails may grow up to be more aggressive. The reasoning postulated by Tom Reimchen, UVic Biologist and supervisor of the study, was that dogs who grew up without being able to efficiently transmit social cues would grow up to be more anti-social and thus more aggressive.

H. Lee Robinson argues that reported concerns of tail docking lack empirical evidence, and is primarily supported by animal rights activists that lack experience with working dogs. Robinson suggests that docking the tail of working dogs at approximately one half length provides the benefits of injury prevention and infection prevention, while also maintaining enough tail length to be used for social communication. Robinson, however, is not a veterinarian or researcher but the owner of American Sentinel K9, which derives income from dogs who have been docked.

Docking has been condemned by the American Veterinary Medical Association, the American Animal Hospital Association, and the Canadian Veterinary Medical Association. These organizations have also called on breed organizations to remove docking from all breed standards.

Influence of kennel clubs
Critics point out that kennel clubs with Breed standards that do not make allowance for uncropped or undocked dogs put pressure on owners and breeders to continue the practice. Although the American Kennel Club (AKC) says that it has no rules that require docking or that make undocked animals ineligible for the show ring, standards for many breeds put undocked animals at a disadvantage for the conformation show ring. The American breed standard for boxers, for example, recommends that an undocked tail be "severely penalized."

The AKC position is that ear cropping and tail docking are "acceptable practices integral to defining and preserving breed character and/or enhancing good health," even though the practice is currently opposed by the American Veterinary Medical Association.

Legal status
Today, many countries ban cropping and docking because they consider the practices unnecessary, painful, cruel or mutilation. In Europe, the cropping of ears is prohibited in all countries that have ratified the European Convention for the Protection of Pet Animals. Some countries that ratified the convention made exceptions for tail docking.

United Kingdom
Show dogs are no longer docked in the United Kingdom. A dog docked before 28 March 2007 in Wales and 6 April 2007 in England may continue to be shown at all shows in England, Wales, Scotland and Northern Ireland throughout its life. A dog docked on, or after, the above dates, regardless of where it was docked, may not be shown at shows in England and Wales where the public is charged a fee for admission. Where a working dog has been docked in England and Wales under the respective regulations, however, it may be shown where the public is charged a fee, so long as it is shown "only to demonstrate its working ability." It will thus be necessary to show working dogs in such a way as to demonstrate their working ability and not conformity to a standard. A dog legally docked in England, Wales, Northern Ireland, or abroad may be shown at any show in Scotland or Northern Ireland.

England and Wales
In England and Wales, ear cropping is illegal, and no dog with cropped ears can take part in any Kennel Club event (including agility and other non-conformation events). Tail docking is also illegal, except for a few working breeds; this exemption applies only when carried out by a registered veterinary surgeon.

The Animal Welfare Act 2006 makes the docking of dogs' tails a criminal offence, except for working dogs such as those used by the police force, the military, rescue services, pest control, and those used in connection with lawful animal shooting. Three options were presented to Parliament in March 2006 with Parliament opting for the second:
 An outright ban on docking dogs' tails (opposed by a majority of 278 to 267)
 A ban on docking dogs' tails with an exception for working dogs (supported by a majority of 476 to 63)
 Retention of the status quo.

Those convicted of unlawful docking are liable to a fine of up to £20,000, up to 51 weeks of imprisonment, or both.

Prior to the ban, the Royal College of Veterinary Surgeons (RCVS), the regulatory body for veterinary surgeons in the United Kingdom, had stated in the 1990s that they considered tail docking to be "an unjustified mutilation and unethical unless done for therapeutic or acceptable prophylactic reasons." In 1995, a veterinary surgeon was brought before the RCVS disciplinary council for "disgraceful professional conduct" for carrying out cosmetic docking. The surgeon claimed that the docking was performed to prevent future injuries, and the case was dismissed for lack of evidence otherwise. Although cosmetic docking was still considered unacceptable by the RCVS, no further disciplinary action was taken against vets performing docking prior to the implementation of the ban.

Northern Ireland
In Northern Ireland, legislation known as Welfare of Animals Act (Northern Ireland) 2011 made tail docking illegal except for certain working dogs.

Scotland
In Scotland, docking of any breed is illegal. The Animal Health and Welfare (Scotland) Act 2006 contains provisions prohibiting the mutilation of domesticated animals. However, the Scottish government has carried out a consultation on this issue and declared that they intend to legislate to bring the law in Scotland in line with the law in England and Wales, meaning that there will be an exemption for certain breeds of working dogs. This is due to the increase in serious spinal trauma reported in field dogs with undocked tails.

Legal status of dog tail docking and ear cropping by country

See also
 Debeaking
 Dubbing (poultry)
 Declawing
 Ear cropping
 Natural bobtail

References
 EFRA – A.D.A. submission https://web.archive.org/web/20110126050347/http://www.anti-dockingalliance.co.uk/page_18.htm

External links

Scientific research

Pro-docking organizations
Association for the Preservation of Purebred Dogs
The Council for Dock Breeds
BC Cropping Coalition

Anti-docking organizations
 Anti-Docking Alliance – A.D.A.
National Pet Advocacy and Welfare Society - NPAWS

Dog anatomy
Dog health
Animal welfare
Cruelty to animals